Frank Kitchener Marsh (7 June 1916 – 1978) was an English footballer who played at half-back for Stafford Rangers, Crewe Alexandra, Bolton Wanderers, Chester, and Macclesfield Town.

Career
Marsh played for Stafford Rangers, Crewe Alexandra, Bolton Wanderers and Chester, also guesting for Lincoln City, Grimsby Town, Rochdale and Port Vale during the war. After the war he made 69 Third Division North appearances for Frank Brown's Chester between in the 1946–47 and 1947–48 seasons, before leaving Sealand Road and moving on to Cheshire County League side Macclesfield Town in January 1949. At Macclesfield he replaced James Quinn at right-half. He moved to centre-half towards the end of the 1949–50 season, and only missed one match, scoring 10 goals. He was captain during the 1950–51 season.

Career statistics
Source:

References

Footballers from Bolton
English footballers
Association football midfielders
Stafford Rangers F.C. players
Crewe Alexandra F.C. players
Bolton Wanderers F.C. players
Chester City F.C. players
Lincoln City F.C. wartime guest players
Grimsby Town F.C. wartime guest players
Rochdale A.F.C. wartime guest players
Port Vale F.C. wartime guest players
Macclesfield Town F.C. players
English Football League players
1916 births
1978 deaths